William E. Carlson (August 30, 1912 – March 13, 1999) was an American politician, educator, and businessman.

Biography
Carlson was born in Saint Paul, Minnesota. He served in the United States Navy during World War II. He graduated from University of St. Thomas and was in the insurance business. He went to Harvard University for two months in 1942 and took a communications course. Carlson taught English literature at the University of St. Thomas. Carlson served in the Minnesota House of Representatives from 1947 to 1952 and was a Democrat. In 1952, Carlson ran for the United States Senate seat from Minnesota and lost the election to Edward Thye, the Republican candidate. Carlson served on the Ramsey County, Minnesota Commission 1957 to 1962. He then served on the Saint Paul City Council from 1966 to 1971 and as Ramsey County Assessor from 1971 to 1977. He died of a heart attack at his home in Saint Paul, Minnesota.

Notes

External links

1912 births
1999 deaths
Businesspeople from Saint Paul, Minnesota
Politicians from Saint Paul, Minnesota
Military personnel from Minnesota
Harvard University alumni
University of St. Thomas (Minnesota) alumni
University of St. Thomas (Minnesota) faculty
County commissioners in Minnesota
Minnesota city council members
Democratic Party members of the Minnesota House of Representatives
20th-century American politicians
20th-century American businesspeople